Pedara is a comune (municipality) in the Metropolitan City  of Catania in the Italian region Sicily, located about  southeast of Palermo and about  north of Catania.  

Pedara borders the municipalities of Mascalucia, Nicolosi, San Giovanni la Punta, Trecastagni, Tremestieri Etneo, and Zafferana Etnea.

Economy

Tourism 
During the summer season, it is a vacation resort due to the cooler climate than Catania because of the altitude. In the northernmost part is the ancient rural village of Tarderia, surrounded by a large extension of chestnut groves with mountain flora and alpine tree species. From Pedara one can easily reach Etna (about 15 km.). Along the provincial road to Etna, the fossa del Salto del Cane, an ancient extinct crater with an equipped area (Base Point for Hiking in the Etna Park).

References

External links
 Official website

Cities and towns in Sicily